Nodaria is a genus of moths in the family Erebidae described by Achille Guenée in 1854.

Description
Palpi with second joint reaching above vertex of head. Third joint with a tuft of hair on inner side, usually in the males only. Antennae of males with long bristles and cilia. Thorax and abdomen smoothly scaled. Forewings with rectangular apex. The outer margin rounded. Veins 7 to 10 stalked, often with a minute areole at their base. Hindwings with veins 3,4 and 6,7 from angles of cell or on short stalks. Vein 5 from near middle of discocellulars.

Species

Nodaria adra Swinhoe, 1918
Nodaria angulata Wileman & West, 1930
Nodaria arcuata Wileman & West, 1930
Nodaria assimilata Wileman, 1911
Nodaria cidarioides Hampson, 1891
Nodaria cinerea de Joannis, 1929
Nodaria cingala Moore, 1885
Nodaria cornicalis Fabricius, 1794
Nodaria dentilineata Draeseke, 1928
Nodaria dinawa Bethune-Baker, 1908
Nodaria discisigna Moore, 1883
Nodaria discolor Wileman & West, 1930
Nodaria dubiefae Viette, 1982
Nodaria epiplemoides Strand, 1920
Nodaria factitia Swinhoe, 1890
Nodaria flavicosta de Joannis, 1929
Nodaria flavifusca Hampson
Nodaria formosana Strand, 1919
Nodaria grisea Hampson, 1916
Nodaria insipidalis Wileman, 1915
Nodaria lophobela D. S. Fletcher, 1961
Nodaria melaleuca Hampson, 1902
Nodaria melanopa Bethune-Baker, 1911
Nodaria niphona Butler, 1878
Nodaria nodosalis Herrich-Schäffer, 1851
Nodaria pacifica Hampson
Nodaria papuana Hampson
Nodaria parallela Bethune-Baker, 1911
Nodaria parallela Wileman, 1911
Nodaria praetextata Leech, 1900
Nodaria similis Moore, 1882
Nodaria stellaris Butler
Nodaria terminalis Wileman, 1915
Nodaria tristis Butler, 1879
Nodaria tristis Hampson, 1891
Nodaria turpalis Mabille, 1900
Nodaria unicolor Wileman & South, 1917
Nodaria unipuncta Wileman, 1915
Nodaria verticalis D. S. Fletcher, 1961

References

 Guenée (1854). in Boisduval & Guenée. Histoire Naturelle des Insectes
 Herrich-Schäffer (1851). Systematische Bearbeitung der Schmetterlinge von Europa 385, pl. 118, fig. 605.
 
 

Herminiinae
Moth genera